Cerithiopsis arga is a species of very small sea snails, marine gastropod molluscs in the family Cerithiopsidae. It was described by Kay in 1979.

References

arga
Gastropods described in 1979